Zazie Olivia Beetz (born June 1, 1991) is a German-American actress. She starred in the FX comedy-drama series Atlanta (2016–22), for which she received a nomination for the Primetime Emmy Award for Outstanding Supporting Actress in a Comedy Series. She also appeared in the Netflix anthology series Easy (2016–19) and voices Amber Bennett in Amazon's animated superhero action series Invincible.

In film, Beetz has appeared in the disaster film Geostorm (2017) and has played the Marvel Comics character Domino in the superhero film Deadpool 2 (2018) and Arthur Fleck/Joker's neighbor Sophie in the psychological thriller Joker (2019).

Early life and career 
Zazie Olivia Beetz was born in Berlin in 1991. Her father is a German cabinet maker who immigrated to the United States in 1990 after the fall of the Berlin Wall, and her mother is an African-American social worker from New York. Her parents separated when she was very young. Beetz was named after the title character in the Raymond Queneau novel Zazie in the Metro. She has a younger brother named Justin.

Beetz attended pre-school in Berlin and kindergarten in New York City before moving with her family there more permanently at the age of eight, speaking both German and English with her family at home. Her mixed-race identity was a source of discomfort for her during her youth. Growing up in New York's Washington Heights neighborhood, she became interested in acting while attending Muscota New School and performed in community theaters and on local stages. She graduated from the LaGuardia Arts High School in 2009, and attended Skidmore College, graduating in 2013 with a bachelor's degree in French. She spent a year living in Paris.

After Beetz graduated from college, she spent a year "broke and waiting tables" before she was cast in Atlanta.

Personal life 
Beetz is engaged to David Rysdahl, an actor and writer. They met during an acting workshop and have been together since 2014. They started a production company called Sleepy Poppy.

Awards
Beetz received a 2018 Emmy Award nomination for Outstanding Supporting Actress In A Comedy Series, for FX's Atlanta.

Filmography

Film

Television

References

External links 
 
 

1991 births
Living people
21st-century American actresses
21st-century German actresses
Actresses from Berlin
Actresses from New York City
American film actresses
American television actresses
American voice actresses
African-American actresses
Fiorello H. LaGuardia High School alumni
German emigrants to the United States
German film actresses
German people of African-American descent
German television actresses
Skidmore College alumni
21st-century African-American women
21st-century African-American people